Pranayraj Vangari is a Telugu theatre research scholar and Telugu Wikipedia Administrator. With a concept name WikiVatsaram, he has written 365 new articles on Wikipedia in 365 days in a row. He is the first person to achieve this credit in the world. Continuing that trend, he completed 1000 articles in 1000 days as of June 4, 2019. Now he completed 1500 articles in 1500 days as of October 17, 2020.

Birth 
Pranayraj was born in Mothkur, Yadadri Bhuvanagari district in a weavers family. According to Pranayraj, his father is an admirer of films and his mother used to sing Bathukamma songs among others which attracted him towards the arts. He started listening to songs on the radio and practiced singing movie songs from lyrics books. Then he started performing in his school events, Vinayaka Chavithi celebrations and marriage ceremonies in his home town.

Theatre 
Pranayraj participated in Tifli International Theatre Festival for Children and Young Audience, in New Delhi during February 17–23, 2014. On March 20, he established Popcorn Theatre with the performance of Amma Cheppina Katha in Golden Threshold, Abids, Hyderabad by collaborating with some of his friends who are also working in Telugu Theatre. Through the Popcorn Theatre, he is working to attract Children and Youth towards Theatre.

Contributions in Telugu Wikipedia 
 Acted as General Secretary for 10th Anniversary Celebrations in 2014 hosted in Vijayawada and 11th Anniversary Celebration in 2015 hosted in Tirupathi.
 Campaigning about Telugu Wikipedia through various mediums to reach it to everyone. Recognizing Pranayraj's contributions, Wikimedia Foundation invited him to Wikipedia International Conference Wikimania 2016 held in Italy.
 Pranayraj completed 100 days – 100 Wiki articles challenge happening in various languages of Wikipedia worldwide. During 8 September 2016 – 16 December 2016 he had written 100 wiki articles.
 He became the first wikipedian in the world by writing 365 wiki articles in 365 days under WikiVastaram concept. Starting on 8 September 2016, writing a wiki article every day, he completed WikiVastaram on 7 September 2017.
 On 4 June 2019, he completed 1000 days - 1000 Wiki Articles.

References

External links 

 
 Face to Face with Pranayraj in Etv Yuva Programme
 Telugu guy to Wikimania in 10Tv News Video
 Face to Face with Pranayraj in ABN Andhrajothi Channel
 Telugu Wikipedia Contributors (Telugu Velugu Magazine)
 Telugu guy to Wikimania 10Tv News Website - June 17, 2016 (Archived)
 Pranayraj's wiki articles on Telugu Wikipedia
 Files uploaded to Wikimedia Commons by Pranayraj

Living people
21st-century Indian male actors
Wikipedia people
Indian Wikimedians
1985 births
Telugu writers
Telugu male actors
Telugu-language dramatists and playwrights
Telugu-language writers
Male actors from Telangana
Male actors from Hyderabad, India
Writers from Hyderabad, India
Writers from Telangana